Din soldat is a song, written by Mattias Andréasson, Viktor Bolander, Albin Johnsén and Kristin Amparo and recorded by Albin Johnsén and Kristin Amparo for the 2014 EP Din soldat EP. Becoming a major success, the song topped the Swedish singles chart in July that year.

Charts

Weekly charts

Year-end charts

References

2014 songs
Number-one singles in Sweden
Songs written by Mattias Andréasson